Kleiderman was a short-lived punk rock band from São Paulo, Brazil. The band was formed by Branco Mello, Sérgio Britto (both members of Brazilian rock band Titãs) and Roberta Parisi.

The band was initially named Richard Clayderman after the pianist, but the name was later changed to avoid problems with the label. In the album cover (signed by Fernando Zarif), the name "Richard" is covered by a bandaged.

Discography 
The only album by the band was released in 1 December 1994 and was titled Con el mundo a mis pies. Until August 1997, it had sold 6,500 copies. It was released via Banguela Records, co-managed by Mello.

Con el mundo a mis pies

References

External links
 Titãs official Website 

Titãs
Musical groups established in 1994
Warner Music Group artists
Brazilian punk rock groups
Brazilian musical trios
Musical groups from São Paulo
1994 establishments in Brazil